Robert Blaikie McEwan (1881 – 1957) was a Scottish footballer who played for clubs including St Bernard's, Bury, Rangers, Chelsea, Glossop and Dundee.  He played over 100 games in the Football League and nearly 50 in the Scottish Football League and was also on the winning team in the 1910 Scottish Cup final.

Career
McEwan joined Bury of the Football League First Division from Scottish club St Bernard's in 1903; he played 35 times for Bury before returning to Scotland in 1904, where he played for Rangers. A year later, he returned to England to join newly-formed Chelsea.  He played in the club's first game in the Football League and was technically the first Chelsea player to score a goal in a competitive match, as he scored an own goal which gave opponents Stockport County a 1–0 win.

After a season with Queens Park Rangers in which he barely featured in the first team, he returned to Scotland in 1909 to play for Dundee. He was in the "Dee" team that won the 1910 Scottish Cup final.

Style of play
In 1905, the Penny Illustrated Paper likened his style of play to that of 19th-century Scottish international Donald Gow and said he had "plenty of speed and a safe kick".

Personal life
In 1906, McEwan was acclaimed a hero for saving a boy from drowning in the Firth of Forth after a boat capsized.

References

1881 births
Date of birth missing
1957 deaths
Date of death missing
Scottish footballers
Footballers from Edinburgh
English Football League players
Scottish Football League players
Southern Football League players
Association football defenders
St Bernard's F.C. players
Bury F.C. players
Rangers F.C. players
Chelsea F.C. players
Glossop North End A.F.C. players
Queens Park Rangers F.C. players
Dundee F.C. players